Juliet Maryon Mills (born 21 November 1941) is a British-American actress. She is the daughter of actor Sir John Mills and Mary Hayley Bell and the eldest of three siblings; her younger siblings are actress Hayley Mills and director Jonathan Mills.

Mills began her career as a child actress and was nominated at age 18 for a Tony Award for her stage performance in Five Finger Exercise in 1960. She progressed to film work and then to television, playing the lead role on the sitcom Nanny and the Professor in the early 1970s. She received Golden Globe Award nominations for her work in this series and for her role in the film Avanti! in 1972. She won an Emmy Award for her performance in the television miniseries QB VII (1974). In 1983, Mills joined The Mirror Theater Ltd's Mirror Repertory Company, performing in repertory productions such as Rain, Paradise Lost, Inheritors and The Hasty Heart throughout their seasons. From 1999 until 2008, she had a role on the daytime drama series Passions, for which she was nominated for a Daytime Emmy Award.

Early life

Mills was born on 21 November 1941 in London during World War II (1941), though her parents, actor Sir John Mills and playwright Mary Hayley Bell, soon moved the family to the country to be away from the Luftwaffe bombing raids. She is the elder sister of actress Hayley Mills and director Jonathan Mills. Because of her parents' fame, Mills grew up surrounded by famous actors, including Rex Harrison, David Niven and Marlon Brando. She recalled her childhood in the 2000 documentary film Sir John Mills' Moving Memories, written by her brother. Her godmother was actress Vivien Leigh, and her godfather was playwright Noël Coward. She attended the Elmhurst Ballet School, in Camberley, Surrey.

Career
As a child, Mills appeared as an extra in various films, including a role as Freda's 11-week-old baby in the 1942 film In Which We Serve, starring her father. Her first major role came in 1958, when she was 16, in the Peter Shaffer play Five Finger Exercise, as "Pamela Harrington". The show ran one year in London, and then moved to the Music Box Theatre on Broadway. In 1960, Mills was nominated for a Tony Award as "Best Featured Actress" for her performance as Pamela.

Her role as a stowaway dressed as a man, but daughter of a ship's gunner, in episode 2 of "Sir Francis Drake" was one of her first TV appearances (1961) and was echoed by an almost identical role in the 1964 film Carry on Jack.

In the 1960s, she would act both in films and on television, including the film, The Rare Breed with James Stewart and Maureen O'Hara, and on television series such as The Man from U.N.C.L.E., Ben Casey and 12 O'Clock High. The 1970s saw her working mostly in television, although she has stated that the highlight of her film career was the film Avanti! (1972), directed by Billy Wilder, in which she starred with Jack Lemmon, and for which she received a Golden Globe Award nomination in 1973. In 1974 Mills starred in the Italian horror film Beyond the Door alongside fellow English actor Richard Johnson playing the role of Jessica Barrett a woman who becomes demonically possessed after an unplanned pregnancy. The movie was a major success making over $15 million at the box office though the producers were sued by Warner Bros due to similarities to The Exorcist. Mills also appeared in a two-part 1978 episode of the TV series The Love Boat playing Barbara Danver, wife of Alan Danver, played by Dan Rowan, one half of the comedy duo Rowan & Martin.

She is perhaps best known for starring on the American television series Nanny and the Professor, which was called an American version of Mary Poppins. She played Phoebe Figalilly, a nanny with magical powers. Mills has stated that she herself believes in magic, witches and fairies: "There's a lot more, you know, in the aether and around us ... We have guides, and we have angels taking care of us ... I believe in metaphysics, in a big way." She was again nominated for another Golden Globe Award in 1971 for the same role. Despite strong ratings, the series ran only two seasons, in 1970 and 1971. When it moved from a timeslot near The Partridge Family and The Brady Bunch, two hugely successful sitcoms, to a different night of the week, ratings fell eventually leading to its cancellation.

In 1974, she won an Emmy Award for "Outstanding Single Performance by a Supporting Actress in a Comedy or Drama Special" for her performance in the miniseries adaptation of QB VII. During the 1974–75 television season, she also had a recurring role as Dr. Claire Hanley on NBC's Born Free. In 1980, Mills returned to the stage, starring in The Elephant Man, with Maxwell Caulfield. The two actors hit it off, and the younger Caulfield became her third husband, leading Mills to withdraw from acting for a time.

She was the subject of This Is Your Life in 1992, when she was surprised by Michael Aspel during the curtain call of the play Fallen Angels (play) at the Richmond Theatre.

In 1999, she was cast on the daytime drama Passions as Tabitha Lenox, a witch who was burned at the stake in the 17th century. Initially, the character wished harm on other people, but in a June 2007 episode, the character was declared a "good witch." Mills was nominated for her first Daytime Emmy Award for "Outstanding Lead Actress" for the role.

The series ended in August 2008. In 2009, Mills joined the cast the ITV drama Wild at Heart, playing "Georgina", the sister of a character played in the previous series by her real-life sister Hayley. She also guest-starred in two episodes of Hot in Cleveland as Philipa Scroggs, the mother of Joy (played by Jane Leeves).

Personal life

Mills has been married three times. The first time was from 1961 to 1964, to Russell Alquist, Jr., with whom she had a son, Sean. Her second marriage was from 1975 to 1980 to Michael Miklenda, with whom she had a second child, a daughter, Melissa. While married to Miklenda, Mills appeared on Tattletales, and claimed she did not agree with women's liberation because the theatre does not discriminate. In 1980, Mills married Maxwell Caulfield, 18 years her junior. Mills said of the age difference, "Everybody is always interested in the fact that I am married to someone who is a lot younger than I am ... There are no rules, and that's what I believe, because age doesn't really matter. If you meet someone that you're really close to, someone that you love, stick with that."

Mills became a naturalised United States citizen on 10 October 1975.

Theatre credits

Filmography

Film

Television

Other

Awards and nominations

References

External links

 
 
 
 

1941 births
Living people
20th-century American actresses
20th-century English actresses
21st-century American actresses
21st-century English actresses
Actresses from London
American film actresses
American soap opera actresses
American stage actresses
American television actresses
English child actresses
English female dancers
English film actresses
English soap opera actresses
English stage actresses
English television actresses
Emmy Award winners
Primetime Emmy Award winners
Outstanding Performance by a Supporting Actress in a Miniseries or Movie Primetime Emmy Award winners
People educated at the Elmhurst School for Dance
People with acquired American citizenship